In mathematics, specifically combinatorics, a Wilf–Zeilberger pair, or WZ pair, is a pair of functions that can be used to certify certain combinatorial identities. WZ pairs are named after Herbert S. Wilf and Doron Zeilberger, and are instrumental in the evaluation of many sums involving binomial coefficients, factorials, and in general any hypergeometric series.  A function's WZ counterpart may be used to find an equivalent and much simpler sum.  Although finding WZ pairs by hand is impractical in most cases, Gosper's algorithm provides a sure method to find a function's WZ counterpart, and can be implemented in a symbolic manipulation program.

Definition
Two functions F and G form a WZ pair if and only if the following two conditions hold:

  
 

Together, these conditions ensure that

 

because the function G telescopes:

Therefore,

 

that is

 

The constant does not depend on n.
Its value can be found by substituting n = n0for a particular n0.

If F and G form a WZ pair, then they satisfy the relation

 

where  is a rational function of n and k and is called the WZ proof certificate.

Example 
A Wilf–Zeilberger pair can be used to verify the identity

 

Divide the identity by its right-hand side:

 

Use the proof certificate

 

to verify that the left-hand side does not depend on n,
where

Now F and G form a Wilf–Zeilberger pair.

To prove that the constant in the right-hand side of the identity is 1, substitute n = 0, for instance.

References

 .

See also 

 Almkvist–Zeilberger method, an analog of WZ method for evaluating definite integrals.

External links
Gosper's algorithm gives a method for generating WZ pairs when they exist.
Generatingfunctionology provides details on the WZ method of identity certification.

Combinatorics